The Ranfurly Shield, colloquially known as the Log o' Wood, is a trophy in New Zealand's domestic rugby union competition. First played for in 1904, the Shield is based on a challenge system. The holding union must defend the shield in challenge matches, which are usually played at the shield holders home venue, and if the challenger is successful in their challenge they will become the new holder of the Shield. There is a tradition for the first challenges of a new rugby season to be played against smaller associations from the Heartland Championship

Although the professional era of rugby has seen other competitions, such as the NPC and Super Rugby, detracting from the pre-eminence of the Ranfurly Shield, many used to regard it as the greatest prize in New Zealand domestic rugby . This is mainly due to its long history, the fact that every challenge is a sudden-death defence of the Shield, and that any team has a chance to win.

The Shield is currently held by Wellington, who claimed it from Hawke's Bay on 17 September 2022.

History
In 1901 the Governor of New Zealand, The 5th Earl of Ranfurly, announced that he would present a cup to the New Zealand Rugby Football Union to be used as the prize in a competition of their choosing. When the trophy, a shield, arrived, the NZRFU decided that it would be awarded to the union with the best record in the 1902 season, and thenceforth be the subject of a challenge system. Auckland, unbeaten in 1902, was presented with the shield. The shield was designed as a trophy for association football, not rugby. The picture in the centrepiece was a soccer one, and was modified by adding goal posts on the soccer goal in the picture to create a rugby scene. The alterations to the centrepiece are still apparent.

Auckland were on tour in 1903 and did not play any home games, and thus did not have to defend the Shield. Their first defence was against Wellington in 1904, and was unsuccessful.

Since the introduction of the National Provincial Championship in 1976, all home games a Shield-holder plays in the NPC or Heartland Championship, during league play are automatically challenge matches.

Auckland holds the record for the greatest number of consecutive Shield defences, 61 matches between 14 September 1985 and 18 September 1993. During this period Auckland took the Shield on tour to provincial unions that, mainly for financial reasons, would be unlikely to be able to mount a challenge for the trophy. While dismissed by some critics, usually because of the one-sided scores, it was mostly regarded as a success by those involved.

In 1994 when Canterbury wrested the Shield from Waikato, it was in battered condition, with large cracks, chips and peeled varnish. Nearly a century of use had taken its toll. Canterbury player Chris England, skilled in woodwork, fully renovated it, bringing it back into pristine condition.

Challenges
The Shield holder at the end of each season is required to accept at least seven challenges for the following year. All home games during league play, but not during knockout playoffs, in the NPC or Heartland Championship are automatic challenges. The remaining shield defences must be made up of challenges from unions in the other domestic competition. For example, since North Harbour, an Air New Zealand Cup (now NPC) team, held the Shield at the end of the 2006 Cup season despite losing their home quarter-final to Otago, they were forced to defend the Shield against Heartland Championship teams during the 2007 pre-season. Having successfully done so, all their home fixtures in the round-robin phase were Shield defences until they lost the shield to Waikato.

The Shield-holder is never forced to defend the Shield in an away match, although they may choose to, as Auckland, for example, did on a number of occasions during their record tenure between 1985 and 1993. In 2008, Auckland played both their mandatory defences against Heartland teams on the road.

If a challenger successfully takes the Shield, all of their home matches for the rest of the season are defences of it.

Proposed rule changes
In August 2008, the New Zealand Rugby Union released a competitions review that proposed dramatic changes to the Shield rules:

 Once a team has successfully defended the Shield four times, all of the holder's subsequent matches in league play would be mandatory defences, whether home or away. The Shield will not be at stake in semifinals or finals.
 If an Air New Zealand Cup team holds the Shield at the end of the league season, that season's winners of the Meads Cup and Lochore Cup, the two trophies contested in the second-level Heartland Championship, will receive automatic challenges in the following year.

The changes were not implemented but did receive support from Auckland, which held the Shield when the NZRU released its report.

Teams
Just under half of the unions that can contest for the Ranfurly Shield do not have an alias. South Canterbury's emblem is their own Coat of Arms. But a soldier represents their green and black colour and current mascot, Tim and Ru. The mascots were originally used during wartime and were created by Ronald Murray. Many of the unions below have this situation, like Poverty Bay's Weka, it resembles their mascot after the 2011 squads post-match photo after the Lochore Cup final.

Results

 Wairarapa's 1927-era saw them lose to Hawke's Bay 21–10 at Solway Showgrounds Oval, but was subsequently awarded the shield back on a residential breach.

Overall records

Last updated: following Hawke's Bay's successful defence against Southland, 10 September 2022 and Wellington's win over Hawke's Bay 17 September 2022

See also

 Ranfurly Shield 1904-09
 Ranfurly Shield 1910-19
 Ranfurly Shield 1920-29
 Ranfurly Shield 1930-39
 Ranfurly Shield 2000-08
 Ranfurly Shield in 2009
 Ranfurly Shield 2010–2019
 Ranfurly Shield 2020-29

Notes and references

External links
 Rampant Aucks take the 2007 shield 
 Ranfurly Shield at nzrugby.com (history, stories, audio highlights, trivia)

 
Rugby union trophies and awards
Rugby union competitions in New Zealand
Rugby union competitions for provincial teams